Jugul  is a village in the southern state of Karnataka, India. It is located in the Athani taluk of Belagavi district in Karnataka.

Demographics
Jugul is a village in situated in southern part of India and north part of Karnataka State. Postal code of Jugul is 591242. Jugul sets its land with river Krishna also called Krishnamata, It shares another side of river with Maharastra (Khidrapur) by boats.  India census, Jugul had a population of 8955 with 4531 males and 4424 females.
It consists of separate government primary schools for Boys and girls. It also has Urdu primary school. It Has only one high school i.e Karnataka Shikshan Samiti Proud shale (KSSHS).

BANK
Jugul has only one nationalized bank i.e Syndicate Bank was started in 1972. This bank is helpful for farmers for the agriculture loan, Students for the education loan and also housing and vehicles loan also available here.

SCHOOLS
1. Sarakari hiriya prathmik Shale
2. Urdu primary school
3. Karnataka Shikshan Samiti Prathmik Shale (KSSPS)
3. Karnataka Shikshan Samiti High School(KSSHS)

See also
 Belgaum
 Districts of Karnataka

References

External links
 http://Belgaum.nic.in/

Villages in Belagavi district